The Catholic Police Guild (CPG) of England & Wales was founded in 1914 as the Metropolitan and City Catholic Police Guild. This was an association for Catholic Police men and women, and approved by the Roman Catholic Archdiocese of Westminster, in response to representations made by Catholics serving in the Metropolitan and City of London Police Forces. The Patron Saint of the Catholic Police Guild is Saint Michael, the Archangel.

The CPG has a Constitution and Rules approved by the Catholic Bishops' Conference of England and Wales, and a National Executive Committee elected by members each year. The NEC invites a member to act as chairman and may also select a President, who serves a three-year term.

In 1974 the Guild became a national association with membership open to Police Officers serving in the Police Forces in the rest of England and Wales. More recently membership has been opened up to Police Staff & Police Community Support Officers. The CPG also has a Friends category of membership for other civilian supporters. The Guild has had a significant resurgence over the last couple of years. It is particularly experiencing growth in the North-West of England.

The Guild undertakes bi-annual pilgrimages to various important holy places, including Rome, the Holy Land, Fátima, Portugal, Santiago de Compostella in Spain and Poland. In 1985 the Guild went on pilgrimage to Rome to celebrate its seventieth year of foundation, and were addressed by Pope John Paul II on Friday, 12 April 1985.

CPG members often help with stewarding duties at Westminster Cathedral, and every October, Guild members carry the statue of Our Lady in procession from Westminster Cathedral to Brompton Oratory on behalf of the Rosary Crusade of Reparation. Both in 1982 with the visit of Pope John Paul II and in 2010 with the visit of Pope Benedict XVI, the Catholic Police Guild assisted with stewarding. In 1982, Michael Jeffers, a Chief Superintendent in the Metropolitan Police as well as the Chairman of the Guild, was made a Knight of St Gregory by Cardinal Basil Hume in recognition of his efforts leading the stewarding.

List of Chairpersons

Catholic Police Guild of Scotland 

A Catholic Police Guild used to exist in Scotland. In recent years the Guild in this country ceased to operate. However, negotiations are currently underway to revive the Catholic Police Guild in Scotland.

References

External links
 The Catholic Police Guild of England & Wales website

Law enforcement in England and Wales
Catholic lay organisations
1914 establishments in the United Kingdom
Organizations established in 1914
Catholic Church in the United Kingdom